Tello is an Azerbaijani national dance. It is a kind of yalli dance and is related to a female name.

Performance of the dance
Both women and men can perform this dance. The dancers hold the little fingers of each other and lift them at shoulders level. The dancing process consists of two fast parts, during which the shoulders move up and down. This dance is popular almost in all regions of Azerbaijan.

External links
 Национальные танцы на официальном сайте Нахичеванской автономной республики  
 Tello | Azerbaycan Xalq Mahnisi

Azerbaijani dances